Craig Atangalaaq Simailak is a Canadian politician, who was elected to the Legislative Assembly of Nunavut in July 2020. Representing the electoral district of Baker Lake, he was directly acclaimed to office as the only candidate to register by the nomination deadline following the resignation of his predecessor Simeon Mikkungwak.

He previously served on the municipal council of Baker Lake, including a stint as deputy mayor.

He is the son of David Simailak, who previously represented Baker Lake in the legislature from 2004 to 2008.

References

Living people
Members of the Legislative Assembly of Nunavut
Inuit politicians
People from Baker Lake
21st-century Canadian politicians
Inuit from Nunavut
Year of birth missing (living people)